Thomas Edmond Garrison Jr. (January 21, 1922 – June 16, 2013) was an American farmer and politician who served in the South Carolina House of Representatives 1959–1966 and then the South Carolina Senate 1967–1988. In his later life, he was charged with felony assault for punching an autistic child at a YMCA.

Early life
Garrison was born January 21, 1922, in Anderson County, South Carolina; son of Thomas Edmond Garrison and Nettie McPhail Garrison. He graduated from Boys High in Anderson, going on to graduate from Clemson University in 1942 with a degree in Vocational Agriculture. After college Garrison served in the United States Army Air Forces during World War II.

Political career
Garrison was elected to the South Carolina House of Representatives in 1958 and served 1959–1966. He went on to serve in the South Carolina Senate 1967–1988. He died in Anderson County, South Carolina, on June 16, 2013.

Notes

1922 births
2013 deaths
People from Anderson County, South Carolina
Clemson University alumni
Members of the South Carolina House of Representatives
South Carolina state senators
United States Army personnel of World War II
United States Army Air Forces soldiers
Military personnel from South Carolina